Aïn Merane District is a district of Chlef Province, Algeria.

Communes 
The district is further divided into 2 communes:

 Aïn Merane
 Harenfa

References

Districts of Chlef Province